Doug Richards-Jolley is a New Zealand rugby league player who represented New Zealand.

Playing career
Richards-Jolley played for the Ponsonby club in the Auckland Rugby League competition and represented Auckland. In 1951 he was selected to play for New Zealand against the touring French. He was then selected to tour Great Britain in 1951-52, playing in one test match against the British Empire.

Richards-Jolley was part of Auckland sides that lost to the touring French in 1951 and Australia in 1953 and defeated the American All Stars in 1953 and Great Britain in 1954.

References

Living people
New Zealand rugby league players
New Zealand national rugby league team players
Auckland rugby league team players
Ponsonby Ponies players
Rugby league second-rows
Year of birth missing (living people)
Place of birth missing (living people)